John Murray (6 November 1869 – 14 August 1933) was an Irish athlete. He competed in the men's discus throw and the men's hammer throw at the 1908 Summer Olympics.

References

1869 births
1933 deaths
Athletes (track and field) at the 1908 Summer Olympics
Irish male discus throwers
Irish male hammer throwers
Olympic athletes of Great Britain
Place of birth missing